St John and the Holy Cross Church is in Stable Lane, Cotebrook, Cheshire, England.  It is an active Anglican church in the parish of Tarporley, the deanery of Malpas, the archdeaconry of Chester, and the diocese of Chester.  It is a daughter church of St Helen, Tarporley with St Thomas, Eaton.  The church is recorded in the National Heritage List for England as a designated Grade II listed building.

History

St John's was built in 1874–75 to a design by G. E. Street.

Architecture

The church is constructed in red sandstone rubble with ashlar dressings.  It has a roof of red tiles that are pierced along the ridge.  Its plan consists of a four-bay nave, a short chancel with a vestry beneath, and a northeast tower.  The tower is located in the angle between the nave and the chancel, and is buttressed.  It contains a clock face and louvred lancet bell openings.  At the summit is a pyramidal cap with a weathervane.  The nave windows are small, with three lights and trefoil heads.  On the sides of the chancel are two lancet windows.  Beneath the chancel, the vestry has a door with a Caernarvon arch, and a two-light mullioned window.  The east end is buttressed and contains a triple lancet window.  At the west end are four lancet windows with trefoil heads, with a quatrefoil window above, and an entrance doorway leading to an internal porch.

The font is octagonal, and is carried on eight clustered shafts.  Above the altar is a 17th-century painting of the Petition of the Repentant Sinners.  The east window contains stained glass dated 1882 by Kempe, which is a memorial to Sir Philip de Malpas Grey-Egerton and his wife.  There are other windows containing glass by Kempe, dated between 1885 and 1895.

See also

Listed buildings in Utkinton

References

External links

GENUKI page with photographs

Churches completed in 1875
19th-century Church of England church buildings
Gothic Revival church buildings in England
Cotebrook, St John's Church
Cotebrook, St John's Church
Cotebrook, St John's Church
Cotebrook, St John's Church
Cotebrook, St John's Church